William Henderson Calder was a 19th-century Member of Parliament in Invercargill, New Zealand.

He represented the Invercargill electorate in Parliament from 1871 to 1873, when he resigned.

References

Members of the New Zealand House of Representatives
Year of birth missing
Year of death missing
New Zealand MPs for South Island electorates
19th-century New Zealand politicians